Cutthroat Boyz is an American hip hop group from California. The trio consists of rappers Vince Staples and Aston Matthews, and rapper-producer Joey Fatts.

References 

Musical groups established in 2012
People from Long Beach, California
American hip hop groups
American musical trios
2012 establishments in California